Sternotomis virescens is a species of beetle in the family Cerambycidae. It was described by John O. Westwood in 1845. It has a wide distribution in Africa. It feeds on Coffea canephora.

References

Sternotomini
Beetles described in 1845